In ecology, an oasis is a fertile area of a desert or semi-desert environment that sustains plant life and provides habitat for animals. Surface water may be present, or water may only be accessible from wells or underground channels created by humans. In geography, an oasis may be a current or past rest stop on a transportation route, or less-than-verdant location that nonetheless provides access to underground water through deep wells created and maintained by humans. 

The word for oasis in the latter-attested Coptic language (the descendant of Demotic Egyptian) is wahe or ouahe which means a "dwelling place". Oasis in Arabic is al-wāḥat ( واحه ).

Description 
Oases develop in “hydrologically favored” locations that have attributes such as a high water table, seasonal lakes, or blockaded wadis. Oases are made when sources of freshwater, such as underground rivers or aquifers, irrigate the surface naturally or via man-made wells. The presence of water on the surface or underground is necessary and the local or regional management of this essential resource is strategic, but not sufficient to create such areas: continuous human work and know-how (a technical and social culture) are essential to maintain such ecosystems. Some of the possible human contributions to maintaining an oasis include digging and maintaining wells, digging and maintaining canals, and continuously removing opportunistic plants that threaten to gorge themselves on water and fertility needed to maintain human and animal food supplies. Stereotypically, an oasis has a “central pool of open water surrounded by a ring of water-dependent shrubs and trees…which are in turn encircled by an outlying transition zone to desert plants.”

Rain showers provide subterranean water to sustain natural oases, such as the Tuat. Substrata of impermeable rock and stone can trap water and retain it in pockets, or on long faulting subsurface ridges or volcanic dikes water can collect and percolate to the surface. Any incidence of water is then used by migrating birds, which also pass seeds with their droppings which will grow at the water's edge forming an oasis. It can also be used to plant crops.

The stark ratio of oasis to desert land in the world means that the oasis ecosystem is “relatively minute, rare and precious.”

There are 90 “major oases” within the Sahara Desert. Some of their fertility may derive from irrigation systems called foggaras, khettaras, lkhttarts, or a variety of other regional names. 

In some oases systems, there is “a geometrical system of raised channels that release controlled amounts of the water into individual plots, soaking the soil.” 

Oases often have human histories that are measured in millennia. Archeological digs at Ein Gedi in the Dead Sea Valley have found evidence of settlement dating to 6,000 BC. Al-Ahsa on the Arabian Peninsula shows evidence of human residence dating to the Neolithic.

Anthropologically, the oasis is “an area of sedentary life, which associates the city [medina] or village [ksar] with its surrounding feeding source, the palm grove, within a relational and circulatory nomadic system.”

The location of oases has been of critical importance for trade and transportation routes in desert areas; caravans must travel via oases so that supplies of water and food can be replenished. Thus, political or military control of an oasis has in many cases meant control of trade on a particular route. For example, the oases of Awjila, Ghadames and Kufra, situated in modern-day Libya, have at various times been vital to both north–south and east–west trade in the Sahara Desert. The location of oases also informed the Darb El Arba'īn trade route from Sudan to Egypt, as well as the caravan route from the Niger River to Tangier, Morocco. The Silk Road “traced its course from water hole to water hole, relying on oasis communities such as Turpan in China and Samarkand in Uzbekistan.”

According to the United Nations, “Oases are at the very heart of the overall development of peri-Saharan countries due to their geographical location and the fact they are preferred migration routes in times of famine or insecurity in the region.”

Oases in Oman, on the Arabian Peninsula near the Persian Gulf, vary somewhat from the Saharan form. While still located in an arid or semi-arid zone with a date palm overstory, these oases are usually located below plateaus and “watered either by springs or by aflaj, tunnel systems dug into the ground or carved into the rock to tap underground aquifers.” This rainwater harvesting system “never developed a serious salinity problem.”

In the drylands of southwestern North America, there is a habitat form called Palm Oasis (alternately Palm Series or Oasis Scrub Woodland) that has the native California fan palm as the overstory species. These Palm Oases can be found in California, Arizona, Baja California, and Sonora.

Agroforestry 

People who live in an oasis must manage land and water use carefully. The most important plant in an oasis is the date palm (Phoenix dactylifera L.), which forms the upper layer. These palm trees provide shade for smaller understory trees like apricots, dates, figs , olives, and peach trees, which form the middle layer. Market-garden vegetables, some cereals (such as sorghum, barley, millet, and wheat), and/or mixed animal fodder, are grown in the bottom layer where there is more moisture. The oasis is integrated into its desert environment through an often close association with nomadic transhumant livestock farming (very often pastoral and sedentary populations are clearly distinguished). The fertility of the oasis soil is restored by “cyclic organic inputs of animal origin.” In summary, an oasis palm grove is a highly anthropized and irrigated area that supports a traditionally intensive and polyculture-based agriculture. 

Responding to environmental constraints, the three strata create what is called the "oasis effect." The three layers and all their interaction points create a variety of combinations of “horizontal wind speed, relative air temperature and relative air humidity.” The plantings—through a virtuous cycle of wind reduction, increased shade and evapotranspiration—create a microclimate favorable to crops; “measurements taken in different oases have showed that the potential evapotranspiration of the areas was reduced by 30 to 50 percent within the oasis.”

The keystone date palm trees are “a main income source and staple food for local populations in many countries in which they are cultivated, and have played significant roles in the economy, society, and environment of those countries.” Challenges for date palm oasis polycultures include “low rainfall, high temperatures, water resources often high in salt content, and high incidence of pests.”

Distressed systems
Many historic oases have struggled with drought and inadequate maintenance. 

According to a United Nations report on the future of oases in the Sahara and Sahel, “Increasingly…oases are subject to various pressures, heavily influenced by the effects of climate change, decreasing groundwater levels and a gradual loss of cultural heritage due to a fading historical memory concerning traditional water management techniques. These natural pressures are compounded by demographic pressures and the introduction of modern water pumping techniques that can disrupt traditional resource management schemes, particularly in the North Saharan oases.”

For example, five historic oases in the Western Desert of Egypt (Kharga, Dakhla, Farafra, Baharyia, and Siwa) once had “flowing spring and wells” but due to the decline of groundwater heads because of overuse for land reclamation projects those water sources are no more and the oases suffer as a result.

Morocco has lost two-thirds of its oasis habitat over the last 100 years due to heat, drought, and water scarcity. The Ferkla Oases in Morocco once drew on water from the Ferkla, Sat and Tangarfa Rivers but they are now dry but for a few days a year.

List of places called oases

Old World oases
 Kharga Oasis, Egypt
 Al-Qatif and Al Ahsa - Saudi Arabia
 Al-Ula Oasis, Saudi Arabia
 Al Ain - UAE
 Buraimi Oasis, Maghta, and Bahla - Oman
 Bahariya Oasis, Farafra, and Siwa Oasis - Egypt
 Ghadames and Kufra - Libya
 Jalo Oasis - Libya 
 Ouargla, Taut, and Timimoun - Algeria
 Tozeur and Tamerza - Tunisia
 Ourzazat - Morocco
 Kebili Oasis, Tunisia
 Biskra Oasis, Algeria
 Khorezm Oasis, Central Asia
 Tafilalt, Morocco
 Seba Oasis, Sabha, Libya
 Oasis of Ghouta, Syria
 Wadi Rum, Jordan
 Inaren, Morocco
 Gafsa Oases, Tunisia
 Ghout Oasis, Algeria
 Crescent Lake, Dunhuang, China
 Hexi Corridor oases, China
 Wadi Bani Khalid, Oman
 Liwa Oasis, United Arab Emirates
 Chebika Oasis, Tunisia
 Ein Gedi, Israel
 Krupaj Springs, Serbia
 Timimoun Oasis, Algeria
 Turfan Oasis, China

New World dryland systems with oasis-like attributes
 Huacachina, Peru
 Quitobaquito, Organ Pipe Cactus National Monument, Arizona
 Kitowok, Sonora, Mexico
 Fish Springs National Wildlife Refuge in Utah, United States
 Havasu Falls, Grand Canyon, Arizona
 Cuatro Ciengas basin, Chihuahuan desert, Mexico
 Oasis Spring Ecological Reserve, Salton Sea, California

Gallery of oases

See also 

  – the world's largest irrigation project; developed in Libya to connect cities with fossil water.
 
 
 
 
 
 
 
 
 Lençóis Maranhenses National Park (Brazil)
 Great Green Wall (disambiguation)
 Aflaj Irrigation Systems of Oman
 Palmeral of Elche
 Fog oasis (South America)

References

Bibliography

External links 

 

 
Lacustrine landforms
Waystations